Swarndih, formerly Sondhia, is a small village in the Indian state of Bihar. Swarndih is known to have existed as a village since 1932. In 1950, Swarndih became an important political center. Committees are formed by youths of the village and reviewed periodically when needed.

Festival Celebrations
Every new year starts with a Saraswati puja celebration, in which youths gather and arrange an idol of Saraswati. Everyone from the village visits to worship the Goddess Saraswati, who is known for the blessing of Education. Later the idol is submersed in the pond of the village. On may 2021 our village swarndih got series of new temples near by primary school of swarndih.The temples include Lord Shiva and Hanuman ji.It is newly architected temples looks vey attractive in the night .All the villagers gather there in the evening and perform aarti and pray for prosperity and peace of swarndih and for the world.     

Holi is celebrated in a traditional way, with people gathering and singing traditional songs while playing with musical instruments.

Durga Puja is celebrated in almost every house of this village. All the Hindu festivals are celebrated each year. One of the most major festivals, Chhath, is celebrated on the bank of the irrigation river located near the power grid.

Transportation
The nearest railway station is Sultanganj.

Nearby Localities
 Tarapur
 Sultanganj
 Deoghar
 Munger

Today, Swarndih is known for its educational facilities and relative prosperity. Swarndih is rich in culture and crops. It is a growing village, with a lot of information technology. The village has various cultural activities like Saraswati Puja and the plays performed in Sarawati Puja, spirituality, Traditional Song of Holi, sports, and literature. These activities and job opportunities attract migrants. Other jobs include IT, Banking and private businesses.

Schools
Swarndih has one primary school.

References

Villages in Munger district